The 220 Meridian, formerly known as the AT&T 220 Building, is a 23-floor high rise located at 220 North Meridian Street in Indianapolis, Indiana. It was completed in 1974 when it served as the headquarters of Indiana Bell.

It is connected with the 22-story AT&T Building, located just to the north at 240 North Meridian Street, and both buildings housed the Indiana headquarters for AT&T. The AT&T 220 Building was sold to Cleveland-based Geis Properties in 2013 for $16.5 million.

In 2017, the building was purchased Keystone Realty Group which has proposed spending $80 million to convert it to mixed-use with restaurants, office space, apartments, and parking.

See also
 List of tallest buildings in Indianapolis
List of tallest buildings in Indiana

References

External links

 
 
 
 

220 Building
Office buildings completed in 1974
1974 establishments in Indiana
Skyscraper office buildings in Indianapolis
Residential skyscrapers in Indianapolis